XT9 is a text predicting and correcting system for mobile devices with full keyboards rather than the 3x4 keypad on old phones. It was originally developed by Tegic Communications, now part of Nuance Communications. It was created for devices with styluses, but is now used for touch screen devices too. It is a successor to T9, a popular predictive text algorithm for mobile phones with only numeric pads.

References 

.

External links 
 Nuance XT9 customer facing site

Mobile software
Input methods for handheld devices